The Wiscasset, Waterville and Farmington Railway is a  narrow gauge railway. The line was operated as a for-profit company from 1895 until 1933 between the Maine towns of Wiscasset, Albion, and Winslow, but was abandoned in 1936.

History

The line began operating to Weeks Mills on February 20, 1895, as the Wiscasset and Quebec Railroad. The line was reorganized in 1901 as the Wiscasset, Waterville and Farmington Railway following the inability to negotiate a crossing of the Belfast and Moosehead Lake Railroad near Burnham Junction.  The reorganized WW&F completed a branch line from Weeks Mills to the Kennebec River at Winslow but failed to negotiate a connection with the Sandy River Railroad at Farmington, and therefore never reached Quebec.

The WW&F hauled potatoes, lumber, and poultry along with other general freight and passengers. Freight tonnage in 1914 was 43% outbound lumber, 16% outbound potatoes and canned corn, 14% inbound feed and grain, 10% inbound manufactured goods, 5% inbound coal, and 4% outbound hay.

In the late 1920s, the railroad began to struggle, thanks to competition from roads. It was purchased by Frank Winter, a businessman with lumber interests in Palermo. He had also bought two cargo schooners, which he proposed would carry coal north from Boston and return south with lumber, while the railroad would transport coal and lumber between Wiscasset and interior points in Maine. On June 15, 1933, as a result of a locomotive derailment, operations ceased and this business venture never came to fruition. Winter died in 1936. Most of the railroad was scrapped, while the schooners were abandoned beside the railroad wharf in Wiscasset.

Wiscasset, Waterville & Farmington Railway Museum
Beginning in 1989, a non-profit organization established the WW&F Railway Museum, which continues to operate as of 2019. It restored several privately owned pieces of former WW&F rolling stock and rebuilt about 3 miles of former WW&F track in Alna. The museum runs  gauge steam and diesel locomotives and other historic equipment, and has other pieces on static display.

Main Line geography 1895–1933

Milepost 0: Wiscasset -
Transfer yard largely built on pilings over the Sheepscot River estuary including a wharf, passing siding, interchange tracks with the standard gauge Maine Central Railroad and spurs serving a creamery and a grain warehouse.
North of the transfer yard was the diamond crossing of the Maine Central Railroad with a wooden platform connecting separate station buildings for the two railroads.
A 3-stall enginehouse and turntable, a long coal shed, a large 3-track car shop, two storage sidings, and a water tank were north of the Maine Central diamond.

Milepost 4.8: Sheepscot -
Small agent's station building with a northbound spur.

Milepost 6.4: Alna Centre -
Small flag stop passenger shelter.

"Top of Mountain" was a southbound spur atop the uphill grade from Head Tide to Alna

Milepost 9.1: Head Tide -
Agent's station building of standard design with 2 southbound spurs.  Some distance north of the station a third southbound spur served a gravel pit.  A covered water tank was north of the gravel pit.

Milepost 12.3: "Iron Bridge"
The most impressive bridge on the line carried the rails over the Sheepscot River.  The railroad was within a relatively steeply incised portion of the Sheepscot River valley between Head Tide and Whitefield.  The through truss bridge had previously been used as part of an early Maine Central Railroad bridge over the Kennebec River at Waterville, Maine.

Milepost 13.3: Whitefield -
Agent's station building of standard design with a passing siding.

Milepost 15.7: Prebles -
Small flag stop passenger shelter.

Milepost 17.4: North Whitefield -
Agent's station building of standard design with a southbound spur serving a potato warehouse.  A short distance north of the station, a second southbound spur served Clary's mill.

Milepost 20.4: Cooper's Mills -
Agent's station with a passing siding and a southbound spur serving a potato warehouse.  The original station was a covered design with doors at either end to allow the train to pass through; but this was replaced in the early 1900s with a newer design similar to those constructed on the Winslow branch.  There was a covered water tank south of the station.

Milepost 23: Maxcy's -
Small flag stop passenger shelter with a southbound spur.

Milepost 24: Windsor -
Agent's station building of standard design with a southbound spur.

Milepost 28.2: Weeks Mills -
Agent's station building of standard design with a separate shed-roofed freight house, a covered water tank, one or two passing sidings, a wye for the branch to Winslow, and two southbound spurs for a potato warehouse and a cannery.

Milepost 31: Newell's -
Small flag stop passenger shelter with a southbound spur.

Milepost 32.9: Palermo -
Agent's station building of standard design with a passing siding and a southbound spur serving a potato warehouse.  Some distance north of Palermo was a covered water tank, a southbound spur serving a gravel pit, and, in later years, a northbound spur serving a sawmill owned by the last operator of the railroad.

Milepost 36.5: Cole's -
Flag stop.

Milepost 38: China -
Agent's station building of standard design with a southbound spur serving a potato warehouse.

Milepost 40: South Albion -
Small flag stop passenger shelter.

Milepost 43.5: Albion -
Agent's station building of standard design was subsequently modified to add a second story with living quarters. Several southbound spurs served a cannery, a sawmill, a tannery, and two potato warehouses.  A turntable and single-stall enginehouse were near the station, and there was a covered water tank about a half-mile south of the station.

Branch Line geography 1902–1916
Milepost 31.5: South China - Agent's station building of newer design with a northbound spur serving a potato warehouse.  There was a covered water tank about one-quarter mile south of the station.

Milepost 32.5: China Lake - Flag stop.

Milepost 33.7: Clark's - Flag stop.

Milepost 36.5: East Vassalboro - Agent's station building of newer design with a northbound spur.

Milepost 39.1: North Vassalboro - Agent's station building of newer design with a southbound spur.  A northbound spur served a gravel pit south of the station.  Three southbound spurs served an American Woolen Company mill north of the station; and there was a covered water tank north of the woolen mill.

Milepost 42.7: Winslow - Agent's station building of newer design with a southbound spur.  There was also a turntable and enginehouse for the decade this point served as the primary northern terminus of the railroad.  Rails were removed from the Winslow end of the branch in 1912, but the railroad provided freight service as far as North Vassalboro for a few more years.

Rolling stock

Construction started with a Porter 14-ton  Forney locomotive originally built for the Sandy River Railroad in 1883. They were flat cars #1–20, box cars #21-25, caboose #26, lowside coal gondolas #27–30, and box cars #31–36. The Portland Company also built a wedge snowplow, a flanger, and two 19-ton  Forney locomotives #2–3. These were clerestory-roofed baggage-express-RPO #1, clerestory-roofed coaches #2–3, and arch-roofed coach #4 designated a smoking car.

Portland Company built 32 more cars when the railroad reorganized for construction to Winslow. Coal gondolas were numbered 101–105 and flatcars were numbered 38, 40, 42, 44, 46, and 48-58. Boxcars #60–64 were about  taller than the earlier boxcars. These were coach #5, baggage-RPO-smoking car #6, and open excursion car #7.

Portland Company built 32 more cars before World War I. Wedge snowplow #402 and flanger #202 were built in 1905.  Boxcars #65–74 were built in 1906. Flatcars #106–115 were built in 1907 and #116–125 were built in 1912.  All except the snowplow were on the heavy  underframe.

Carson Peck purchased three locomotives in 1907.  No. 5 was a 15-ton  Forney built by Hinkley for the Bridgton and Saco River Railroad in 1882. Baldwin #6 was a 26-ton 2-6-2 and #7 was a 28-ton  Forney. These two new outside-frame Baldwin engines moved most main-line trains until they were damaged in the 1931 Wiscasset enginehouse fire.  Frank Winter then purchased two used locomotives from the discontinued Kennebec Central Railroad to keep the Wiscasset railroad operating. Portland #8 was a 19-ton  Forney built for the Bridgton and Saco River Railroad in 1892 and Portland #9 was an 18-ton  Forney built for the Sandy River Railroad in 1891.

The Wiscasset car shop completed a number of rebuilding projects starting with the conversion of six of the original flatcars to boxcars during the first year of railroad operations.  The shop then rebuilt one end of smoking car #4 into a baggage compartment. After the smoking car burst into flame in 1904, its trucks were used under the caboose.  The caboose was renumbered from 26 to 301 after its cupola was removed.  Excursion car #7 was converted to a replacement combination RPO-smoking car in 1906.  The  gondolas were rebuilt as flatcars when the  gondolas were delivered, and the  gondolas were rebuilt as simple flatcars within a year. Box cars #65, 72 and 73 were rebuilt with hinged doors, insulated walls, and 2 windows for use as cream cars carrying an attendant to load and record milk cans.  As the  boxcars needed repair, they were rebuilt to the full height of the  boxcars and renumbered in the 300 series with special-purpose modifications. Cars #302-304 had end doors and six windows on each side for use as express cars in passenger train service.  Many later cars of the 300 series contained stoves to keep potatoes from freezing during winter shipment.  Ten of the  flatcars were rebuilt in 1910 as heated insulated boxcars #501–510 for potato loading.  Boxcars #509 was rebuilt with hinged doors for cream car service after car #73 was destroyed in 1913. Flatcar #10 was rebuilt in 1913 with a derrick for placing riprap.  The remaining three  flatcars were rebuilt in 1916 into express cars #80–82 with end doors and 6-foot-wide side doors. Combination #6 was converted to an express car by removing interior features and placing protective bars across the windows.

Locomotives

Former units

See also

List of heritage railroads in the United States

Notes

References

 
 
 
 
 
 
 
 
 
 
  1895, 1896, 1897, 1898, 1899, 1900, 1901, 1902, 1903, 1904, 1905, 1906, 1907, 1908, 1909, 1910, 1911, 1912, 1913 and 1914

External links

 WW&F Railway Museum
WW&F Railway Facebook Page

Heritage railroads in Maine
Railroad museums in Maine
2 ft gauge railways in the United States
Narrow gauge railroads in Maine
Defunct Maine railroads
Museums in Lincoln County, Maine